Body Forward is the 2010-11 FIRST Lego League competition. The project and missions revolve around biomedical engineering.

Project
Teams were tasked with identifying a problem that can occur in the human body and creating an inventive solution. Then teams shared their project with the community and with judges at competition.

Gameplay
The table performance portion of Body Forward is played on a 4 ft by 8 ft field rimmed by wood boards. At competition, two of these fields are placed together to form an 8 ft square. In each -minute match, a team competes on each field with their robot to earn up to 400 points manipulating the mission models.

One of the mission models, the Mechanical Arm Patent, straddles both fields in the center. This model can earn points for either team, or both in the rare circumstance of simultaneous triggering.

The touch penalty objects are red blood cell models. All 11 are worth 5 points each anywhere on the field, but are removed every time the robot is touched outside of base.

Missions

All of the Body Forward missions related to various medical fields and practices. They are:
 Common Bone Repair - 25 points
 Special Bone Repair - up to 25 points
 Rapid Blood Screening - up to 40 points
 Bad Cell Destruction - up to 25 points
 Mechanical Arm Patent - 25 points
 Cardiac Patch - 20 points
 Pacemaker - 25 points
 Nerve Mapping - 15 points
 Object Control Through Thought - 20 points
 Medicine Auto-Dispensing - up to 30 points
 Robotic Sensitivity - 25 points
 Professional Teamwork - 25 points
 Bionic Eyes - 20 points
 Stent - 25 points
 Red Blood Cells - up to 55 points

References

External links
Official website

FIRST Lego League games
2010 in robotics